Undercover Doctor is a 1939 American crime film directed by Louis King, written by William R. Lipman and Horace McCoy. The film stars Lloyd Nolan, Janice Logan, J. Carrol Naish, Heather Angel, Broderick Crawford and Robert Wilcox. It was released on June 9, 1939 by Paramount Pictures.

Plot
Dr. Bartley Morgan appears to be a highly respectable doctor and runs a profitable private practice with his nurse Margaret Hopkins. Underneath his respectable veneer, he is engaged in a range of illegal activities. FBI agent Robert Anders investigates Morgan.

Cast 
Lloyd Nolan as Robert Anders
Janice Logan as Margaret Hopkins
J. Carrol Naish as Dr. Bartley Morgan
Heather Angel as Cynthia Weld
Broderick Crawford as Eddie Krator
Robert Wilcox as Tom Logan
Richard Carle as Elmer Porter
Stanley Price as Johnny Franklin
John Eldredge as Gordon Kingsley
George Meeker as Dapper Dan Barr
Raymond Hatton as Dizzy Warner
Phil Warren as Spats Edwards
Paul Fix as Monk Jackson
Richard Denning as Frank Oliver
Paul E. Burns as Mack Belton
Paul Stanton as Courtney Weld
Clem Bevans as Sam Whitmore
Charles Trowbridge as Lt. Watson
Charles Williams as Pinky Valkus

References

External links 
 

1939 films
Paramount Pictures films
American crime films
1939 crime films
Films directed by Louis King
American black-and-white films
1930s English-language films
1930s American films